Jadwiga Chojnacka (11 October 1905 – 23 December 1992) was a Polish film actress. She appeared in more than 30 films between 1948 and 1989.

Selected filmography
 Five Boys from Barska Street (1954)
 Tonight a City Will Die (1961)
 Panienka z okienka (1964)
 Copernicus (1973)
 The Story of Sin (1975)

References

External links

1905 births
1992 deaths
Polish film actresses
Actresses from Warsaw
People from Warsaw Governorate
Recipients of the Order of Polonia Restituta
20th-century Polish actresses
Polish stage actresses
Burials at Powązki Military Cemetery